We Continue the Change (PP), sometimes translated as Change Continues, is a centrist, anti-corruption political party and formerly an electoral alliance in Bulgaria led by Kiril Petkov and Asen Vasilev, the former caretaker Economy and Finance Ministers, respectively. It was founded ahead of the November 2021 Bulgarian National Assembly election. Petkov and Vasilev registered their party as "We Continue the Change" on 15 April. Despite legal challenges regarding the party name, the party was officially approved by 9 August.

History

Background and formation 

The controversial third Borisov government, a coalition between the conservative GERB and the nationalist United Patriots alliance, with the support of the populist Volya Movement, sparked mass protests over corruption allegations, which led to the rise of several new parties and populist movements. At the end of the term of the National Assembly, a parliamentary election was held in April 2021, which saw the minor coalition partners fail to reach the 4% threshold. Instead several anti-Borisov parties and electoral coalitions entered parliament (ITN, DB and IBG-NI), with a combined 92 seats. None of them were willing to form a government with any of the other "status quo" parties (BSP, GERB and DPS) and the BSP was unwilling to work with GERB. Thus no government could be formed and a snap election was scheduled to take place in July. Bulgarian President Rumen Radev appointed an interim government.

Several ministers from the interim government became outspoken critics of Borisov and his allies. This included Interior minister Boyko Rashkov, Finance minister Asen Vasilev, Economy minister Kiril Petkov and Education minister Nikolai Denkov. The July 2021 election saw the three "protest parties" make gains to a total of 112 seats, and ITN surpassed GERB to become the winning party. However no government could be formed, and another snap election was scheduled to take place in November, alongside the Presidential election. Three of the anti-Borisov interim ministers (Asen Vasilev, Kiril Petkov and Nikolai Denkov) had been offered to join ITN's government, however, they refused the offer.

Petkov and Vasilev stated that they would start their own political project that would be an alternative anti-corruption party which could be seen as a "uniting force" between the other parties. A new interim government was appointed by president Radev which did not include ministers Petkov and Vasilev. Their party was officially launched on 17 September 2021, following a month-long speculation about its creation.

November 2021 election 
Since the party was created too late to have its own registration, it had to compete in the elections within an electoral coalition alongside one or more registered member parties. This was done through Volt Bulgaria and Middle European Class, with the former being a party that recently left the parliamentary coalition IBG-NI.

For the 2021 presidential election, Petkov and Vasilev declared their support for the incumbent President Rumen Radev. The party favoured working with the anti-establishment parties, not in a pre-electoral coalition, but instead in the form of an agreement of cooperation following the November election. There was speculation it may join a coalition with BSP for Bulgaria. It did not rule out working with GERB–SDS or DPS, but Petkov set out harsh conditions if they were to cooperate. 

In the November election, the party came out on top with over 25% of the vote and 67 of the 240 seats. It was given the mandate to form a government on 13 December 2021, and formed a broad coalition between the anti-establishment parties There Is Such a People and Democratic Bulgaria, alongside the leftist BSP for Bulgaria. The government, led by Petkov, set out to remove corruption within the country and counter the problems faced by Bulgaria, including the energy crisis and COVID-19 pandemic.

Petkov government 

The new government included five ministers from the interim governments that preceded it - Petkov, Vasilev, Rashkov, Denkov and former prime minister Stefan Yanev. Yanev was dismissed following his refusal to label the Russo-Ukrainian conflict as a war. The government became a minority government on 8 June 2022, when ITN pulled out of it. Several weeks later, it became was the first government in Bulgarian history to lose a vote of confidence. No party was able to form another government and a new election was scheduled to take place.

2022 parliamentary election 
The new election saw PP fall to second place with 19.5% and 53 seats, behind GERB. As the second largest party, they were given a mandate for government formation following the rejection of GERB's candidate by the National Assembly. Their candidate for Prime Minister was Nikolai Denkov, who did not receive a majority in Parliament. PP refused to join in talks with BSP, and new elections will be scheduled for Spring 2023.

Ideology and platform 
PP is a centrist party, although it has been also described as a centre-left or a centre-right party. Ideologically, it has been described as a liberal, and social-liberal party. A pro-European and anti-corruption party, economically, its main goals are to create a favourable economic and administrative environment for the free development of small and medium-sized businesses and to attract strategic high-tech investments and was called third way for Bulgarian standards. On a more political level, they seek to stop corruption and misuse of state funds as well as uphold the rule of law. Priority for government formation is the access to quality education and healthcare for all Bulgarian citizens, modern infrastructure. They also stress social policy, in particular improving pensions for retired people.

For the 2021 parliamentary elections, the coalition campaigned on a vague platform to attract voters of different persuasions, with particular emphasis on the corruption of the former government of Boyko Borisov. Kiril Petkov and Asen Vasilev, both businessmen, were seen as pro-business and advocated anchoring Bulgaria in the European Union and NATO.

National affiliation

2021–2022 elections 
In 2021 and 2022 PP ran in a coalition of the same name, "We continue the change", alongside two smaller "mandate carrier" parties, Volt Bulgaria, and Middle European Class (SEC), which surrendered their party lists up to the coalition to be used at the election. Additionally for the November 2021 election, the Political Movement "Social Democrats" was a part of the electoral coalition and the Union of Free Democrats unofficially supported it.

2023 election 

Ahead of the 2023 election PP merged with another anti-corruption coalition, DB. The two had worked closely together in the previous parliament. There has been speculation that they may be joined by other anti-corruption parties, some of which had been a part of IBG-NI.

Election results 
The coalition took part in the November 2021 Bulgarian election, coming in first place with 25.67% of the vote and 67 seats. At the election, the coalition won 67 seats. 4 went to SEC and 2 seats were won by Volt. The main 'We Continue the Change' party won the rest of the seats. In 2022, the electoral coalition dropped down to second place behind GERB–SDS, with 53 seats overall.

National Assembly

References

2021 establishments in Bulgaria
2022 establishments in Bulgaria
Anti-corruption parties
Centrist parties in Bulgaria
Liberal parties in Bulgaria
Political parties established in 2021
Political parties established in 2022